Mads Giersing Valentin Pedersen (born 1 September 1996), usually known as Mads Mini or Mads Valentin, is a Danish professional footballer who plays for Bundesliga club FC Augsburg.

Club career

FC Nordsjælland
Valentin was promoted to the first team squad in the summer of 2015, at the age of 19 and got his contract extended.

On 27 September 2015, Valentin got his Superliga debut in a game against AGF, who FCN won 2–0, where he came on the pitch in the 93rd minute, replacing Oliver Thychosen. During the 2016–17 season, Valentin became a key player for FCN and the U21 national team.

Valentin's contract got extended in the summer of 2017, and besides that, he also revealed that he dreamed of a foreign adventure. In September 2017, Valentin suffered from a horrible ligament injury in his knee, that would keep him out for at least eight weeks.

In November 2018, Mads changed his shirt name from his nickname "Mini" to his middle name "Valentin" to honor his family.

FC Augsburg
On 27 June 2019, Valentin joined FC Augsburg on a contract until June 2024. Valentin got his official debut on 17 August 2019 against Borussia Dortmund where he also was noted for an assist in a 5–1 defeat. After only three games for Augsburg in his first half season, Valentin was loaned out to FC Zürich on 30 January 2020 for the rest of the season.

International career
Valentin was called up to the senior Denmark squad for friendly matches against the Netherlands and Serbia on 26 and 29 March 2022, respectively.

References

External links
 
 Mads Valentin on DBU 

1996 births
Living people
Association football defenders
Danish men's footballers
Danish expatriates in Germany
Denmark under-21 international footballers
Denmark youth international footballers
Danish Superliga players
Bundesliga players
Swiss Super League players
FC Nordsjælland players
FC Augsburg players
FC Zürich players
Expatriate footballers in Germany
Expatriate footballers in Switzerland
Danish expatriate sportspeople in Germany
Danish expatriate sportspeople in Switzerland
People from Fredensborg Municipality
Sportspeople from the Capital Region of Denmark